James D. Thomas Jr. (born November 22, 1980) is an American former professional basketball player who most recently worked as an assistant coach for the Maine Red Claws of the NBA Development League. A 6'8" forward from the University of Texas at Austin, Thomas was the recipient of the 2004-05 NBA Development League Rookie of the Year. He played in the NBA for the Portland Trail Blazers, Atlanta Hawks, Philadelphia 76ers, and Chicago Bulls. After that he took his career overseas.
In 2012, he signed with Maccabi Haifa BC.
For the 2013–14 season he signed with Maccabi Rishon LeZion.

Notes

External links

1980 births
Living people
21st-century African-American sportspeople
African-American basketball players
American expatriate basketball people in the Dominican Republic
American expatriate basketball people in Israel
American expatriate basketball people in Italy
American expatriate basketball people in Mexico
American expatriate basketball people in Turkey
American expatriate basketball people in Venezuela
American men's basketball players
Atlanta Hawks players
Basketball coaches from New York (state)
Basketball players from New York (state)
Chicago Bulls players
Erdemirspor players
Fortitudo Pallacanestro Bologna players
Hargrave Military Academy alumni
Lega Basket Serie A players
Maccabi Haifa B.C. players
Maccabi Rishon LeZion basketball players
Maine Red Claws coaches
Marinos B.B.C. players
Philadelphia 76ers players
Portland Trail Blazers players
Power forwards (basketball)
Roanoke Dazzle players
Scafati Basket players
Soles de Mexicali players
Sportspeople from Schenectady, New York
Teramo Basket players
Texas Longhorns men's basketball players
Undrafted National Basketball Association players
20th-century African-American people